2022 Mogadishu hotel attack may refer to:

August 2022 Mogadishu attack
November 2022 Mogadishu attack